Gushlavandan (also Romanized as Gūshlavandān; also known as Gūshī Lavandān, Koshlyavandan, and Kūshalvandān) is a village in Rud Pish Rural District, in the Central District of Fuman County, Gilan Province, Iran. At the 2006 census, its population was 940, in 242 families.

References 

Populated places in Fuman County